Ludmila da Silva (born 1 December 1994), commonly known as Ludmila, is a Brazilian professional footballer who plays as a forward for Atlético Madrid of Spain's Primera División and the Brazil women's national team.

Club career

A high school athletics champion, Ludmila took up organised football at the relatively late age of 15. She was noticed by a scout from CA Juventus and then moved on to play for São Caetano, Portuguesa, Rio Preto and São José as a fast and strong winger.

In August 2017, Ludmila agreed to a transfer to Spanish Primera División club Atlético Madrid. Her exceptional pace led her to be dubbed: "Road Runner". Good performances and six goals in the first half season prompted Atlético to extend her initial two-year contract by another year in December 2017.

In September 2018, Ludmila assisted the first goal and scored the second to eliminate Manchester City from the 2018–19 UEFA Women's Champions League Round of 32, securing Atlético's place in the Round of 16.

International career
Ludmila was part of the Brazilian under-20 selection at the 2014 South American U-20 Women's Championship in Uruguay, scoring three goals at the tournament. In the 2–0 final win over Paraguay, she won a penalty which Andressa converted, and then scored the second goal herself.

In June 2017, Ludmila was called up to the senior Brazil squad for the first time for a friendly match against Germany in Sandhausen. She reportedly did not have a passport and had to urgently obtain one to accept the call-up. She stated that national coach Emily Lima, previously her boss at Juventus and São José, was a mother figure to her. In Germany, Brazil fielded a weakened team as the match was outside FIFA-specified international dates and some regular players were unable to attend. Ludmila capitalised on an error by German goalkeeper Almuth Schult to mark her debut with a goal, but Brazil lost 3–1.

In previous training sessions with the national team, Ludmila had been stung by criticism from a team official who suggested she was good at running but did not know when to release the ball. Ludmila scored the only goal in a behind closed doors training match against Canada in Ottawa on 4 September 2018.

International goals

Personal life
Ludmila is Afro-Brazilian and was brought up in a favela by her aunt, as her mother left the family and her father died during her childhood. In 2016 her older sister also died.

References

External links
 
 Profile at La Liga 
 

1994 births
Living people
Brazilian women's footballers
Brazil women's international footballers
Brazilian expatriate women's footballers
Brazilian expatriate sportspeople in Spain
Expatriate women's footballers in Spain
People from Guarulhos
Women's association football forwards
São José Esporte Clube (women) players
Primera División (women) players
Atlético Madrid Femenino players
2019 FIFA Women's World Cup players
Footballers at the 2020 Summer Olympics
Olympic footballers of Brazil
Footballers from São Paulo (state)